Lonchocarpus molinae is a species of plant in the family Fabaceae. It is found only in Honduras.

References

molinae
Endemic flora of Honduras
Critically endangered flora of North America
Taxonomy articles created by Polbot